The Women's Softball World Cup is a fastpitch softball tournament for women's national teams held historically every four years, now every two years, by the World Baseball Softball Confederation (WBSC). The tournament, originally known as the ISF Women's World Championship, was sanctioned by the International Softball Federation (ISF) until that body's 2013 merger with the International Baseball Federation to create the WBSC. The number of teams in the tournament began at five in its inaugural event in 1965, went to a high of 28 for the 1994 edition, and now the WBSC Code legislates that the maximum number of teams that may participate is 16. There are qualifying tournaments that determine which countries will play at the World Cup.

History
A women's softball world championship predates the ISF's event.  A championship was held in Canada between several American and Canadian teams in 1952 and 1953.  Australia had also hosted an international tournament that predated the first Women's World Championship.

In 1965, the first ISF Women's World Championship was held in Melbourne, with games being played at Albert Park. Five nations competed at the inaugural championships including the United States, Japan and Australia, which Australia won 1–0 in a final game against the United States. In the game, Australia was held to only two hits while the United States had four. Lorraine Woolley was named the player of the tournament. The inaugural men's championship would occur one year later in Mexico.

In 1970, ten countries participated.  The Japanese won competition after having twelve consecutive wins and beating the Americans 3–0 in a final game spectated by 30,000 people.

In 1974, the Americans knocked out the Australians during the semi-finals, when they beat them by a score of 6–0.

Taiwan's leadership discussed inviting China to compete at the 1982 competition which was the country was hosting. Ching-khou and Wang Shen supported mainland China's participation in the event and an invitation was issued but the Chinese government elected to not send a team.

The 1990 edition was the seventh to be held, with six countries having played hosts to the competition.

Teams that competed in 1990 included the US, New Zealand, China, Australia, Chinese Taipei, Japan, Canada, Italy, Netherlands, Cuba, Puerto Rico, Philippines, Bahamas, Netherlands Antilles, Mexico, Aruba, Bermuda, Indonesia, Argentina, and Zimbabwe. The United States took home gold, New Zealand silver and China bronze. The Soviet Union had a representative attend the 1990 competition and promise that a Soviet side would be competing at the next championships.

The 2006 edition was very important as the Championships were used for Olympic qualifying, with the top four finishers going to the Olympic Games.  In 2006, the fourth-place finishers automatically qualified to the Games because China was the Olympic Games based on that.  Thus, there was a battle for fifth place between Canada and Italy for Olympic qualifications.  In the match for fifth, Canada won 3-0 and earned their fourth consecutive trip to the Olympics.

Teams that will be competing at the 2012 edition include Australia, Canada and Japan who will play in the same pool.  The competition was scheduled to act as a replacement for the Olympics.

Results
Australia won the competition in 1965. The victory was considered very impressive as they beat the Americans, who invented the game in 1887, to win the championship. Japan won in 1970, while the 1974 and 1978 editions were won by the United States, the American side also won seven championships in a row from 1988 to 2010, with the USA's most recent victory being a 7–0 win over Japan in the finals. Other countries that have won it include Japan in 1970, 2012 and 2014, and New Zealand in 1982. Teams that have finished second include the US in 1965, 1970, 2012 and 2014, Japan in 1974, 2002, 2006 and 2010, Canada in 1978, Taiwan in 1982, China in 1986 and 1994, New Zealand in 1990, and Australia in 1998. Countries that have finished third include the Philippines in 1970.

 * 1990: Rain washed out the grand final, leading USA to win based on its record in round-robin play.

Medal table

Hosting
The 1970 edition was hosted by Japan in Osaka. The 1974 edition was played in Stratford, United States. The 1978 games were played in San Salvador, El Salvador. The 1982 competition was hosted by in Chinese Taipei in Taipei. The 1986 edition was hosted by New Zealand and held in Auckland. In 1990, the competition was played in Normal, Illinois. The 1994 edition was played in St. John's, Newfoundland. Japan hosted the 1998 competition in Fujinomiya. The 2002 Championships were held in Saskatoon, Canada. China hosted the 2006 Championships in Beijing. The 2010 edition was hosted by Venezuela. The 2012 championship took place in Whitehorse, Yukon, Canada.  The 2014 championships were held in Haarlem, Netherlands.  The 2016 Tournament was held in Surrey, British Columbia.

Participating nations

q: Qualified, w: Withdrew

See also
Softball at the Summer Olympics
Softball at the World Games

References

External links
WBSC official website

 
Recurring sporting events established in 1965
World Baseball Softball Confederation competitions